9999 is a cardinal number which precedes 10000.

9999 may also refer to:

 9999, year in the far future
 9999 (album), 2019 album by The Yellow Monkey
 9999 Wiles, asteroid approximately 7 kilometers in diameter